The 2015 Copa de España de Fútbol Sala is the 26th staging of the Copa de España de Fútbol Sala. It takes place in Ciudad Real, Castilla-La Mancha from 12 – 15 March. The matches are played at Quijote Arena for up to 5,863 seats. The tournament is hosted by Castilla-La Mancha regional government, Ciudad Real municipality & LNFS. Ciudad Real hosts Copa de España for first time.

Jaén Paraíso Interior caused a great upset when defeated seeded No.3, ElPozo Murcia in Quarter-finals & seeded No.3, FC Barcelona in the Final to win its first ever title.

Qualified teams
The qualified teams were the eight first teams on standings at midseason.

Venue

Matches

Quarter-finals

Semi-finals

Final

See also
2014–15 Primera División de Futsal
2014–15 Copa del Rey de Futsal

References

External links
Official website

Copa de España de Futsal seasons
Espana
Futsal